Philippus Vethaak (1 October 1914 – 23 September 1991) was a Dutch cyclist. He competed in the individual and team road race events at the 1936 Summer Olympics.

See also
 List of Dutch Olympic cyclists

References

External links
 

1914 births
1991 deaths
Dutch male cyclists
Olympic cyclists of the Netherlands
Cyclists at the 1936 Summer Olympics
People from Vlaardingen
Cyclists from South Holland